The  is a 1,500 V DC commuter electric multiple unit (EMU) train type operated by the private railway operator Odakyu Electric Railway in Japan since 2007.

Design
The trains are based on the JR East E233-2000 series narrow-body EMU design to permit subway running. The traction motors are fully enclosed to reduce environmental noise.

Formation
, 15 ten-car sets are in service, numbered 4051 to 4065, and formed as follows.

 Cars 3, 7, and 9 each have one single-arm pantograph.
 Car 2 is designated as a mildly air-conditioned car.

Interior
Passenger accommodation consists of longitudinal bench seating throughout. Cars 1 and 10 have wheelchair spaces.

History
The first train was delivered in May 2007, and the trains entered service in September 2007 on inter-running services between Odakyu and the Tokyo Metro Chiyoda Line, displacing 1000 series sets, which were cascaded to surface lines to replace older 5000 and 5200 series sets.

From 26 March 2016, the 4000 series began operation on the JR East Joban Line.

References

External links

 Odakyu Press Release (5 February 2007). Retrieved on 13 October 2009. 

Electric multiple units of Japan
4000 series
Train-related introductions in 2007
1500 V DC multiple units of Japan
Tokyu Car multiple units
J-TREC multiple units